Plus One is a Russian romantic comedy film directed by Oksana Bychkova, released in 2008.

Plot 
Masha (Madeleine Dzhabrailova), an English-Russian translator, accompanies puppeteer Tom (Jethro Skinner) from the UK to Moscow, where he has been hired to conduct master classes with young actors of the puppet theater.

Masha and Tom seem to have very little in common.  Masha is very serious about life and what people think about it, whereas Tom perceives the world as a theater play. However, both have lonely lives; Masha loves her dictionaries, and Tom's sole companion is a doll-glove, which he carries with him always.  Their mutual isolation from the world draws them together and they fall in love.  When it is time to leave, Masha is able to let go of Tom easily, for she now feels ready to start a new life.

Cast
 Madlen Dzhabrailova
 Jethro Skinner 
 Yevgeny Tsyganov
 Pavel Derevyanko
 Yuri Kolokolnikov
 Alexander Adabashyan
 Miriam Sehon
 Miroslava Karpovich
 Andrey Merzlikin
 Sergei Druzyak
 Vladimir Ilyin
 Sergei Frolov

Awards
Jethro Skinner —  Award for Best Actor at the Open Russian Film Festival Kinotavr
Madeleine Dzhabrailova —  Award for Best Actress at the IX Open Russian Festival  Smile, Russia!
Audience Award at the 2008 Window to Europe Film Festival

References

External links
 

2008 films
Russian romantic comedy films
2008 romantic comedy films
Films about interpreting and translation
2000s Russian-language films